Darrows Creek is a  long 3rd order tributary to Conneauttee Creek in Erie County, Pennsylvania.  This is the only stream of this name in the United States.

Course
Darrows Creek rises about 0.5 miles east of Edinboro, Pennsylvania, and then flows north and then makes a curve to the south to join Conneauttee creek just south of Edinboro.

Watershed
Darrows Creek drains  of area, receives about 45.1 in/year of precipitation, has a wetness index of 456.55, and is about 47% forested.

See also
 List of rivers of Pennsylvania

References

Rivers of Pennsylvania
Rivers of Erie County, Pennsylvania